The Women's 4 × 100 metre medley relay event at the 2010 Commonwealth Games took place on 9 October 2010, at the SPM Swimming Pool Complex.

There were just eight teams, so all teams made the final and only one race was swum.

Final

References

Aquatics at the 2010 Commonwealth Games
2010 in women's swimming